Casmena nigricolor is a species of leaf beetle of Senegal, described by Maurice Pic in 1951.

References

Eumolpinae
Beetles of Africa
Taxa named by Maurice Pic
Beetles described in 1951